Falmouth is a village located along the Avon River in Hants County between Mount Denson and Windsor in the Canadian province of Nova Scotia.

History
Falmouth and area was known as Pisiquid by the Acadians. Having migrated from Port Royal (current day Annapolis Royal) (see also Habitation at Port-Royal, an earlier settlement several miles away that predates the French occupation of Annapolis Royal), the Acadians first settled the area in the early 1680s as the 1686 census lists a number of families on well established farms utilizing productive dyked fields. During Queen Anne's War, in response to the French Raid on Deerfield, Massachusetts, in the Raid on Pisiquid (1704), Benjamin Church burned the many villages of the two parishes (Ste. Famille and Notre Dame de l'Assumption) that made up the district to the ground and took prisoners to Boston. One of these prisoners was Acadian leader Noel Doiron. As with the other Acadian districts of the Bay of Fundy region the Acadians of Piziquid were deported in the fall of 1755 (see Expulsion of the Acadians).

By 1760 the land left vacant by the deportation of the Acadians began to be resettled by New England Planters. Amongst these new settlers was a young Henry Alline, who in the 1770s would start a Great Awakening religious revival.  His New Lights ideas and followers quickly spread across the region and into northeastern New England.

Demographics 

Present day
Falmouth is home to Avon Valley Greenhouses, Sainte-Famille Wines, the Avon Valley Golf & Country Club, and numerous farms and several small businesses. Falmouth District Elementary School is also located in Falmouth. The village is located exactly halfway between the North Pole and the Equator.

Notable residents
 George Lawrence Price, the last soldier of the British Empire to be killed in the First World War.
 Joseph Frederick Wallet DesBarres
 Noel Doiron
Henry Alline
 Marie Anne Payzant

References

External links 
Annapolis Valley Tourism.com
"Ste. Famille Cemetery"

Communities in Hants County, Nova Scotia
Designated places in Nova Scotia
General Service Areas in Nova Scotia